The Akanksha Foundation founded by Shaheen Mistri is a non-profit organization in India, which works with children from low-income communities. The foundation works primarily in the field of education, through its "School Project" model. 

Akanksha runs schools in Mumbai, Pune and Nagpur in partnership with the municipalities. 

Akanksha was founded by Shaheen Mistri in 1991. She now heads Teach for India.

References

External links
 

Educational organisations based in India
Charities based in India
Organisations based in Mumbai
1991 establishments in Maharashtra
Organizations established in 1991